Acanthognathus laevigatus is a species of ant belonging to the genus Acanthognathus. Described in 2009 by Galvis & Fernández, the species is native to Colombia.

References

Myrmicinae
Hymenoptera of South America
Insects described in 2009